Mitchell "Mitch" Garcia (born April 7, 1989) is an American professional soccer player.

Career

College and Youth
Garcia started at Phoenix College in 2009, before transferring to Grand Canyon University in 2010.

While at college, Garcia also appeared for NPSL club Arizona Sahuaros.

Professional
After leaving college, Garcia trained with Polish side Puszcza Niepołomice and Serbian club FK Čukarički, but was signed by neither.

Garcia played with USL PDL club's FC Tucson and Vermont Voltage in 2013, before signing his first professional contract with NASL club Atlanta Silverbacks on February 26, 2014. He made his professional debut on June 7, 2014 against Indy Eleven. He started and played 90 minutes with the result ending in a 3-3 tie

References

External links 
 Atlanta Silverbacks Profile.

1989 births
Living people
American soccer players
FC Tucson players
Vermont Voltage players
Atlanta Silverbacks players
FC Arizona players
Association football defenders
Soccer players from Phoenix, Arizona
North American Soccer League players
USL League Two players
National Premier Soccer League players
American soccer coaches
Grand Canyon Antelopes men's soccer players
Arizona Sahuaros players
North Carolina FC players
Major Arena Soccer League players
St. Louis Ambush (2013–) players